Bom Sucesso de Itararé is a municipality in the Brazilian state of São Paulo.

History
The municipality of Bom Sucesso de Itararé was established in 1991, when it was separated from Itararé.

Government

 Mayor: Dirceu Pacheco de Oliveira (PSDB) (2009–2012)

Geography

Rivers
 Itararé River
 Verde River
 Pirituba River

Demography

Its population in 2020 was 3,984 inhabitants.

2000 Census figures
Total population: 3,231
 Urban: 1,954
 Rural: 1,277
 Men: 1,669
 Women: 1,562
Density (inhabitants/km2): 24.26 
Infant mortality up to 1 year old (per thousand): 29.51 
Life expectancy (years): 65.20 
Fertility rate (children per woman): 3.40 
Literacy rate: 85.82% 
Human Development Index (HDI): 0.693
 Income: 0.603
 Longevity: 0.670
 Education: 0,805

Economy

The economy of Bom Sucesso de Itararé is based on ranching and mining industry.  Its first mine was opened in 1949.

Transport

The first road linked Bom Sucesso to the municipality of Itararé  A second riad was opened in 1948 and linked it to the city of Itapeva.
 SP-258 state highway

References

External links

 Associação Paulista de Municípios [Paulista Association of Municipalities] (in Portuguese)
 Censo 2010 at IBGE
 Hino do município de Bom Sucesso de Itararé [Anthem of Bom Sucesso de Itararé Municipality] (in Portuguese) at Wikisource

Municipalities in São Paulo (state)